Eucalyptus redunca, commonly known as black marlock, is a species of mallee or a shrub that is endemic to Western Australia. It has smooth bark, lance-shaped adult leaves, flower buds in groups of between nine and fifteen, lemon-coloured flowers and barrel-shaped fruit.

Description
It has grey and pale brown bark that is shed in short ribbons. Flowering occurs from July to October or November and the flowers are lemon-coloured.

Taxonomy and naming
Eucalyptus redunca was first formally described in 1844 by Johannes Conrad Schauer in 1844 in Johann Georg Christian Lehmann's book Plantae Preissianae. The specific epithet (redunca) is from the Latin word reduncus meaning bent backwards, referring to the tip of the operculum that is sometimes bent when young.

Distribution
Black marlock is found on undulating, low ridges mostly along the south coast between Cape Riche and the Fitzgerald River National Park, and inland as far as Ravensthorpe. It grows in shrubland and open woodland in sand-clay soils often over laterite.

The species is associated with the western mallee subgroup which is characterised by several eucalypts including E. oleosa, E. moderata, E. incrassata, E. foecunda, E. eremophila and E. uncinata. The understorey is predominantly shrubby with species of Melaleuca and Acacia along with the occasional Triodia.

Conservation status
This mallee is classified as "not threatened" by the Western Australian Government Department of Parks and Wildlife.

See also
 List of Eucalyptus species

References

redunca
Endemic flora of Southwest Australia
Mallees (habit)
Myrtales of Australia
Eucalypts of Western Australia
Plants described in 1844
Taxa named by Johannes Conrad Schauer